John Neville Figgis  (2 October 1866 – 13 April 1919) was an English historian, political philosopher, and Anglican priest and monk of the Community of the Resurrection. He was born in Brighton on 2 October 1866. Educated at Brighton College and St Catharine's College, Cambridge, he was a student of Lord Acton at Cambridge, and editor of much of Acton's work.

He is remembered in relation to the history of ideas and concepts of the pluralist state. The latter he in some ways adapted from Otto von Gierke; his ideas were picked up by others, such as G. D. H. Cole and Harold Laski. Some of the books which belonged to Figgis form part of the Mirfield Collection which is housed in the University of York Special Collections.

He was professed in the Community of the Resurrection at Mirfield in 1909. He died on 13 April 1919 in Virginia Water.

Works
The Divine Right of Kings (1896), second edition 1914 
Christianity and History (1905)
Studies of Political Thought from Gerson to Grotius, 1414–1625 (1907) Birkbeck Lectures, 1900
The Gospel and Human Needs (1909) Hulsean Lectures
Religion and English Society (1911)
Civilisation at the Cross Roads (1912)
Antichrist and Other Sermons (1913)
Churches in the Modern State (1913)
The Fellowship of the Mystery (1914) Bishop Paddock Lectures 
The Will to Freedom: or, The Gospel of Nietzsche and the Gospel of Christ (1917)
Some Defects of English Religion (1917)
Hopes for English Religion (1919)
The Political Aspects of S. Augustine's City of God (1921)

References

Footnotes

Bibliography

Further reading

External links

 
 
 
 Directory of works by John Neville Figgis 1866–1919 from Project Canterbury

1866 births
1919 deaths
19th-century Anglican theologians
19th-century English male writers
19th-century English Anglican priests
19th-century English Christian theologians
19th-century English historians
19th-century English philosophers
20th-century Anglican theologians
20th-century English male writers
20th-century English Anglican priests
20th-century English historians
20th-century English philosophers
20th-century English theologians
Alumni of St Catharine's College, Cambridge
Anglican monks
Anglican philosophers
Anglo-Catholic theologians
Anglo-Catholic socialists
Church of England priests
Converts to Anglicanism
English Anglican theologians
English Anglo-Catholics
English Christian monks
English Christian socialists
English male non-fiction writers
English political philosophers
Fellows of St Catharine's College, Cambridge
Intellectual historians
People educated at Brighton College